Paul Sokody Jr. (August 18, 1914 – May 12, 1992) was an American professional basketball player. He played for the Sheboygan Red Skins and Chicago Studebaker Flyers in the National Basketball League for five total seasons, averaging 5.3 points per game for his career.

After basketball, Sokody worked at Hardy Salt Company for 35 years. He also refereed more than 2,000 high school and college basketball games, including Big Ten Conference and Missouri Valley Conference contests.

References

1914 births
1992 deaths
American men's basketball players
Basketball players from Illinois
Chicago Studebaker Flyers players
College men's basketball referees in the United States
Forwards (basketball)
Marquette Golden Eagles men's basketball players
Sheboygan Red Skins players
Sportspeople from Elgin, Illinois